Marion High School is a public secondary school in Marion, Kansas, United States.  It is one of three schools operated by Marion–Florence USD 408 school district.  It is the sole public high school for the communities of Marion, Florence, Aulne, Canada, Eastshore, Marion County Lake, and nearby rural areas of Marion County

History
High school students from Florence started attending Marion High School in the fall of 1971 after the Florence High School was closed in the same year.

Academics
The high school is a member of T.E.E.N., a shared video teaching network, started in 1993, between five area high schools.  The high school has a library for student access.

Extracurricular activities

Sports
The Marion High School mascot is a Warrior. All high school athletic and non-athletic competition is overseen by the Kansas State High School Activities Association. For 2010/2011 seasons, the football team competes as Class 3A. Recently the City of Marion and Unified School District 408 jointly build a gymnasium and indoor swimming pool. Located just south of Marion Elementary School, the pool is open all year round and the gym features a walking track above a sunken gymnasium floor. The bond issue that financed the project also built a new auditorium on the Marion High School campus.

Notable people
 Randolph Carpenter, U.S. Representative from Kansas and a U.S. Army World War I veteran. 
 William M. Runyan, preacher, songwriter who composed Great Is Thy Faithfulness

See also
 List of high schools in Kansas
 List of unified school districts in Kansas

References

External links
 Official Website
 USD 408 School District Boundary Map, KDOT
 Marion City Map, KDOT

Public high schools in Kansas
Schools in Marion County, Kansas